In project management (e.g., for engineering), accurate estimates are the basis of sound project planning.  Many processes have been developed to aid engineers in making accurate estimates, such as
Analogy based estimation
Compartmentalization (i.e., breakdown of tasks)
Cost estimate
Delphi method
Documenting estimation results
Educated assumptions
Estimating each task
Examining historical data
Identifying dependencies
Parametric estimating
Risk assessment
Structured planning

Popular estimation processes for software projects include:
 Cocomo
 Cosysmo
 Event chain methodology
 Function points
 Planning poker
 Program Evaluation and Review Technique (PERT)
 Proxy-based estimating (PROBE) (from the Personal Software Process)
 The Planning Game (from Extreme Programming)
 Weighted Micro Function Points (WMFP)
 Wideband Delphi

See also
 Estimation in software engineering
 Software development effort estimation
 Comparison of development estimation software
 Cognitive bias
 Decision making
 Decision making software
 Work Breakdown Structure
 Project management
 List of project management software
 Software metric
 Wideband Delphi
 Guesstimate
 Ballpark estimate
 Construction Estimating Software

External links

Project Estimation Methods
 Estimation chapter from "Applied Software Project Management" (PDF)
 The Dynamics of Software Projects Estimation
 Estimations in project management
 Three types of B2C estimates

Project management

de:Schätzung
hu:Becslés
nl:Schatten
pl:Szacowanie
sr:Процена